William Brownlow, 3rd Baron Lurgan KCVO (11 February 1858 – 9 February 1937) was an Anglo-Irish aristocrat, landowner, hotel proprietor, and sportsman.

He was the eldest son of Charles Brownlow, 2nd Baron Lurgan. He was the chairman of the prestigious Ritz Hotel, the Carlton Hotel, Booth's Distilleries, and others. 

In his younger years he was a keen jockey and golfer, and was reportedly one of the few peers to have ever had a hole in one on a golf course. He succeeded to his father's title in 1882.

He was appointed State steward to the recently created Lord Lieutenant of Ireland, Lord Dudley, in September 1902.

He was the subject of caricatures by Max Beerbohm. Brownlow succeeded Harry Higgins as chairman of the Ritz upon his death in 1928, and was especially keen on attracting American guests to the hotel. He was a close friend of the Earl of Carnavon and his American wife, Catherine Wendell, and at times he gave the couple the entire second floor of the hotel to accommodate guests.

Personal life
On 7 February 1893, Lord Lurgan married Lady Emily Julia Cadogan (1871-1909), daughter of George Cadogan, 5th Earl Cadogan, and Lady Beatrix Craven.
 William George Edward Brownlow, 4th Baron Lurgan (22 February 1902 – 1984); married Florence May Cooper (nee Webster) in 1979.

Arms

References

1858 births
1937 deaths
Barons in the Peerage of the United Kingdom
English landowners
British hoteliers
20th-century English businesspeople
21st-century English businesspeople
William
Eldest sons of British hereditary barons
Knights Commander of the Royal Victorian Order